Jockson Dhas (born 9 April 1995) is an Indian professional footballer who plays as a midfielder for Chennaiyin in the Indian Super League.

Career
Jackson is product of SASC, Vallavilai and member of St. Joseph’s College, Trichy football team and he was part of Tamil Nadu football team to play in 71st Senior National Football Championship for 2016–17 Santosh Trophy. He made his professional debut for the Chennai City F.C. against TRAU F.C. on 1 December 2019, he started and players full match as Chennai City won 1–0.

Career statistics

Club

References

1995 births
Living people
People from Nagercoil
Indian footballers
Chennai City FC players  
Footballers from Tamil Nadu
I-League players
Association football midfielders